Koolbury is the name of a closed railway station on the Main North railway line in the Hunter Region of New South Wales, Australia. The station opened in 1909 and has been removed, no trace now remains.

References

Disused regional railway stations in New South Wales
Railway stations in the Hunter Region
Muswellbrook Shire
Railway stations in Australia opened in 1909
Main North railway line, New South Wales